A rocket is a vehicle, missile, or aircraft propelled by an engine that creates thrust from a high speed exhaust jet made exclusively from propellant.

Rocket or Rockets may also refer to:

Projectiles

Rocket (firework), a firework that propels itself into the air in order to fly
Rocket (weapon), an unguided, powered weapon

Arts and entertainment
Rocket: Robot on Wheels, a 1999 video game by Sucker Punch Productions
The Rocket (magazine), a monthly political news magazine published in Malaysia
The Rocket (newspaper), a defunct weekly newspaper in Seattle, Washington and Portland, Oregon
The Rocket (painting), a 1909 painting by Edward Middleton Manigault
"The Rocket" (short story), a 1950 science fiction short story by Ray Bradbury
The Rocket (Slippery Rock), a weekly newspaper published by the students of Slippery Rock University
a character in the animated series Little Einsteins
Zac’s pet hound dog in the animated series Shimmer and Shine
Rocket Comics, a title published by Maple Leaf Publishing

Film
The Rocket (2005 film), a French-Canadian film about the life of ice hockey's Maurice "The Rocket" Richard
The Rocket (2013 film), an Australian film
Rocket (film), a 2015 Indian film

Military 
HMS Rocket, eight ships of the Royal Navy and one planned ship
Operation Rocket, a British Second World War Club Run supplying aircraft to the besieged island of Malta

Music
The Rocket Record Company, a record label founded by Elton John

Bands
Rockets (band), a French space rock band formed in 1972 (a.k.a. Les Rockets)
The Rockets (Detroit band), an American rock band from Detroit
The Rockets (Los Angeles band), pre-Crazy Horse
The Rockets, a Louisiana band featuring Dick Holler
The Rockets, 1950s British rock and roll group led by Tony Crombie
The Rockets, Kansas City big band led by Harlan Leonard, founded in 1937
The Rockets, of Anson Funderburgh and the Rockets, a Texas blues band

Albums
Rocket (Alex G album), 2017
Rocket (Edie Brickell & New Bohemians album), 2018
Rocket (Primitive Radio Gods album), 1996
Rockets (Daniel Lanois album), 2005
Rockets (Rockets album), by the French band, 1976
The Rockets (album), by the Los Angeles band, 1968

Songs
 "Rocket" (Beyoncé song), 2013
 "Rocket" (Def Leppard song), 1987
 "Rocket" (El Presidente song), 2005
 "Rocket" (En Vogue song), 2017
 "Rocket" (Goldfrapp song), 2010
 "Rocket" (Mohamed Ali song), 2009
 "Rocket" (The Smashing Pumpkins song), 1993
 "Rocket", a 1990 song by Susumu Hirasawa from his album The Ghost in Science
 "Rocket", a 1998 song by The Jesus and Mary Chain as a B-side to the single "Cracking Up"
 "Rocket", a 2011 song by The Wanted from their album Battleground
 "Rocket", a 2013 song by A Friend in London from their album Unite
 "Rockets", a 1981 song by Joe Walsh from his album There Goes the Neighborhood
 "Rockets", a 2008 song by Simple Minds from their album Graffiti Soul

People
Rocket (nickname)
Owen Hart (1965–1999), Canadian professional wrestler with the ring name "The Rocket"
Charles Rocket (1949–2005), stage name of American actor Charles Adams Claverie
Rockets Redglare (1949–2001), stage name of American actor Michael Morra
Evan Dollard (born 1982), stage name from the 2008 American Gladiators TV series
Maurice Richard (1921–2000), Canadian professional ice hockey player nicknamed "Rocket"

Characters
Rocky the Flying Squirrel (Rocket J. Squirrel), a main character in the American animated television series The Rocky and Bullwinkle Show
Rocket (DC Comics), a DC Comics character
Rocket Raccoon, a fictional character, of Marvel Comics
Rocket (Marvel Cinematic Universe), the Marvel Cinematic Universe adaptation of Rocket Raccoon
Rocket Red, the first of several characters in DC Comics
Team Rocket, a fictional villainous Pokémon team

Plants
Rocket (plant) (Eruca sativa), a leafy vegetable
Diplotaxis tenuifolia (wild rocket), a leafy vegetable cultivated for its spicy flavoured leaves
Hesperis matronalis (dame's rocket), a wildflower
Reseda luteola (dyer's rocket), a plant that makes a yellow dye
Sisymbrium irio (London rocket), a herbal plant in the family Brassicaceae
Blue rocket, another name for aconitum

Sports teams
Air Transport Command Rockets, a World War II football team from the Air Transport Command
Bayi Rockets, a team in the Chinese Basketball Association
Chicago Rockets, a team in the All-America Football Conference from 1946 to 1949
Dundee Rockets, a defunct ice hockey club that was based in Dundee, Scotland
Houston Rockets, a National Basketball Association team
Jacksonville Rockets, an Eastern Hockey League team from 1964 to 1972
Kelowna Rockets, a Canadian Western Hockey League team
Montreal Rocket, a Quebec Major Junior Hockey League team from 1999 to 2003
Oettinger Rockets, a German basketball team
P.E.I. Rocket, a Quebec Major Junior Hockey League team
Philadelphia Rockets, an American Hockey League team of the 1940s
Reading Rockets, a team in the English Basketball League
Rye House Rockets, an English speedway team
Strathroy Rockets, a Canadian Greater Ontario Junior Hockey League team based in Strathroy, Ontario
Tacoma Rockets, a junior ice hockey team in the Western Hockey League from 1991 to 1995
Tacoma Rockets (PCHL and WHL), a professional ice hockey team in Tacoma, Washington, from 1946 to 1953
Toledo Rockets, the athletic teams of the University of Toledo
Toronto Rockets (soccer), an American Professional Soccer League team for the 1994 season, based in Toronto, Ontario, Canada

Transportation
Dynamic Sport Rocket, a Polish paramotor design
Stephenson's Rocket, also known as The Rocket, an early steam locomotive (1829)
Oldsmobile V8 engine, also called the Rocket
Toronto Rocket, a series of rolling stock used in the Toronto subway system in Toronto, Ontario, Canada
a lightweight vehicle produced by the Light Car Company
several passenger trains operated by the Chicago, Rock Island and Pacific Railroad
 Rock Island Rockets (1937), lightweight diesel-electric passenger trains
a South Devon Railway Comet class steam locomotive

Other uses
Rocket, another name for the vegetable Eruca vesicaria
Rockets (candy), a fruit-flavored sugar candy known as Smarties in the United States
Rocket eBook, e-reader produced by NuvoMedia in late 1998
Rocket Internet, a startup incubator
Johnny Rockets, an American restaurant franchise
The Rocket, Euston, a Grade II listed public house
The Rockets (1987–1991), a Canadian television show that aired on CTV

See also
Rocket immunoelectrophoresis, a biochemical method for determining protein concentration
Rockett (disambiguation)
Rockettes (disambiguation)
Rockit (disambiguation)
Roquet (disambiguation)
Roquetes (disambiguation)
Roquette (disambiguation)
Roquettes